The Fifth Party System is the era of American national politics that began with the New Deal in 1932 under President Franklin D. Roosevelt. This era of Democratic Party-dominance emerged from the realignment of the voting blocs and interest groups supporting the Democratic Party into the New Deal coalition. Following the Great Depression, most black voters switched from the GOP to the Democratic Party, and some conservative, white southern Democrats shifted to the Republican Party as the Democratic party became known as the party of civil rights; this process accelerated in the 1960s and 1970s. For this reason, it is often called the "New Deal Party System". It followed the Fourth Party System, usually called the Progressive Era, and was followed by the Sixth Party System. However, there is a dispute about when the Sixth Party System began.

History
The onset of the Great Depression undermined the confidence of business in Republican promises of prosperity.  The four consecutive elections, 1932, 1936, 1940, and 1944, of Franklin D. Roosevelt gave the Democrats dominance.  The sweeping victory in 1936 consolidated the New Deal Coalition in control of the Fifth Party System at the presidential level; only Dwight Eisenhower in 1952 and 1956 broke its hold on the White House.

The conservative coalition generally controlled Congress from 1938 to 1964, based on the coalition of Northern Republicans and powerful rural white control of the Democratic Party (and congressional representation) in the South where most blacks were disenfranchised.  Even more powerful were the liberals, who controlled the White House and many states, and in order to promote American liberalism, anchored in a New Deal Coalition of specific liberal groups—especially ethno-religious constituencies (Catholics, Jews)—in addition to liberal white Southerners, well-organized labor unions, urban machines, progressive intellectuals, populist farm groups and some Republicans in the Northeast.

The Republican Party was split. A conservative wing, led by  Senator Robert A. Taft (1889–1953) until his death, nominated  Barry Goldwater in 1964. He lost badly but the faction became dominant under Ronald Reagan from 1980 onward. The liberal moderate wing was more successful before 1980; it was led by politicians of the Northeast and the West Coast, including Thomas Dewey, Nelson Rockefeller, Earl Warren, Jacob Javits, George W. Romney, William Scranton,  Henry Cabot Lodge, and Prescott Bush.  Richard Nixon built his career by appealing to both wings.  Nixon won the White House in 1968 and was reelected in 1972, winning 49 states. Nixon's disgrace in the Watergate scandal ruined him and damaged the standing of the Republican Party nationwide.

The later half of the Fifth Party System would feature many southern revolts from presidential tickets from the Democrats, however all of these tickets would fail to force a contingent election in the House. Strom Thurmond, Harry Byrd and George Wallace in 1948, 1960 and 1968 respectively made impressive showings in the Deep South however did not get far anywhere else.

Analysis

The party system model with its numbering and demarcation of the historical systems was introduced in 1967 by Chambers and Burnham. Much of the work published on the subject has been by political scientists explaining the events of their time as either the imminent breakup of the Fifth Party System, and the installation of a new one, or suggesting that this transition had already taken place some time ago. The notion of an end to the Fifth Party system was particularly popular in the 1970s, with some specifying a culminating date as early as 1960.

In Parties and Elections in America: The Electoral Process (2011), authors L. Sandy Maisel and Mark D. Brewer argue that the consensus among experts is that the Sixth System is underway based on American electoral politics since the 1960s:

Opinions on when the Fifth Party System ended include the following: The elections of 1966 to 1968; the election of 1972; the 1980s, when both parties began to become more unified and partisan; and the 1990s, due to cultural divisions.

Stephen Craig argues for the 1972 elections when Richard Nixon won a 49-state landslide. He notes that, "There seems to be consensus on the appropriate name for the sixth party system... Changes that occurred during the 1960s were so great and so pervasive that they cry out to be called a critical-election period. The new system of candidate-centered parties is so distinct and so portentous that one can no longer deny its existence or its character."

The Princeton Encyclopedia of American Political History dates the start of the Sixth Party system in 1980, with the election of Reagan and a Republican Senate. Arthur Paulson argues, "Whether electoral change since the 1960s is called 'realignment' or not, the 'sixth party system' emerged between 1964 and 1972."

See also
 Party systems in the United States
 Civil rights movement (1896–1954)
 Conservative coalition
 New Deal coalition
 Politics of the Southern United States
 Presidency of Franklin D. Roosevelt, first and second terms
 Presidency of Franklin D. Roosevelt, third and fourth terms
 Presidency of Harry S. Truman
 Presidency of Dwight D. Eisenhower
 Presidency of John F. Kennedy
 Presidency of Lyndon B. Johnson
 Presidency of Richard Nixon
 Presidency of Gerald Ford
 Presidency of Jimmy Carter
 Reagan Era

References

Further reading
 Allswang, John M. New Deal and American Politics (1978), statistical analysis of votes
 Andersen, Kristi. The Creation of a Democratic Majority, 1928–1936  (1979), statistical analysis of polls
  Bibby, John F. "Party Organizations, 1946–1996", in Byron E. Shafer, ed. Partisan Approaches to Postwar American Politics, (1998)
 Cantril, Hadley and Mildred Strunk, eds. Public Opinion, 1935–1946 (1951). (A massive compilation of public opinion polls; online.)
 Caraley, Demetrios James, "Three Trends Over Eight Presidential Elections, 1980–2008: Toward the Emergence of a Democratic Majority Realignment?", Political Science Quarterly, 124 (Fall 2009), 423–42
 Fraser, Steve, and Gary Gerstle, eds. The Rise and Fall of the New Deal Order, 1930–1980 (1990); essays on broad topics.
 Gallup, George. The Gallup Poll: Public Opinion, 1935–1971 (3 vol 1972)
 Geer, John G. "New Deal Issues and the American Electorate, 1952–1988", Political Behavior, 14#1 (March 1992), pp. 45–65 .
 Gershtenson, Joseph. "Mobilization Strategies of the Democrats and Republicans, 1956–2000", Political Research Quarterly Vol. 56, No. 3 (Sep. 2003), pp. 293–308. .
 Green, John C. and Paul S. Herrnson. "Party Development in the Twentieth Century: Laying the Foundations for Responsible Party Government?" (2000) 
 Hamby, Alonzo. Liberalism and Its Challengers: From F.D.R. to Bush (1992).
 Jensen, Richard. "The Last Party System: Decay of Consensus, 1932–1980", in The Evolution of American Electoral Systems (Paul Kleppner et al. eds.) (1981)  pp. 219–225.
 Kazin, Michael. What It Took to Win: A History of the Democratic Party  (2022)excerpt

 Ladd, Everett Carll, Jr., with Charles D. Hadley. Transformations of the American Party System: Political Coalitions from the New Deal to the 1970s 2nd ed. (1978).
 Leuchtenburg, William E. In the Shadow of FDR: From Harry Truman to George W. Bush (2001)
 Levine, Jeffrey; Carmines, Edward G.; and Huckfeldt, Robert. "The Rise of Ideology in the Post-New Deal Party System, 1972–1992". American Politics Quarterly (1997) 25(1): 19–34. . Argues that the social basis of the New Deal party system has weakened. The result is ideology shapes partisan support.
 Manza, Jeff and Clem Brooks; Social Cleavages and Political Change: Voter Alignments and U.S. Party Coalitions. Oxford University Press, 1999.
 Manza, Jeff; "Political Sociological Models of the U.S. New Deal". Annual Review of Sociology, 2000. pp. 297+
 Milkis, Sidney M. and Jerome M. Mileur, eds. The New Deal and the Triumph of Liberalism (2002)
 Milkis, Sidney M. The President and the Parties: The Transformation of the American Party System Since the New Deal (1993)
 Murphy, Paul L. ed. "The New Deal Realignment and the Fifth-Party System, 1928-1948" in Paul L. Murphy, ed., Political Parties in American History: 1890-present (vol 3. 1974) pp. 1109-1246.
 Paulson, Arthur. Electoral Realignment and the Outlook for American Democracy (2006)
 Pederson, William D. ed. A Companion to Franklin D. Roosevelt (Blackwell Companions to American History) (2011)
 Riccards, Michael P., and Cheryl A. Flagg eds. Party Politics in the Age of Roosevelt: The Making of Modern America (2022) excerpt

  Robinson, Edgar Eugene. They Voted for Roosevelt: The Presidential Vote, 1932–1944 (1947). Statistical tables of votes by county.
 Schlesinger, Arthur, Jr., ed. History of American Presidential Elections, 1789–2008 (2011). 3 vol and 11 vol editions; detailed analysis of each election, with primary documents;  online v. 1. 1789–1824 – v. 2. 1824–1844 – v. 3. 1848–1868 – v. 4. 1872–1888 – v. 5. 1892–1908 – v. 6. 1912–1924 – v. 7. 1928–1940 – v. 8. 1944–1956 – v. 9. 1960–1968 – v. 10. 1972–1984 – v. 11. 1988–001
 Shafer, Byron E. and Anthony J. Badger, eds. Contesting Democracy: Substance and Structure in American Political History, 1775–2000 (2001)
 Sternsher, Bernard. "The New Deal Party System: A Reappraisal". Journal of Interdisciplinary History v.15#1 (Summer 1984), pp. 53–81. .
 Sternsher, Bernard. "The Emergence of the New Deal Party System: A Problem in Historical Analysis of Voter Behavior". Journal of Interdisciplinary History, v.6#1 (Summer 1975), pp. 127–49.  .
 Sitkoff, Harvard. "Harry Truman and the Election of 1948: The Coming of Age of Civil Rights in American Politics". Journal of Southern History Vol. 37, No. 4 (Nov. 1971), pp. 597–616  .
 Sundquist, James L. Dynamics of the Party System: Alignment and Realignment of Political Parties in the United States, (1983)

Political history of the United States
20th century in the United States